Serious Fun is the first album by Lester Bowie recorded for the Japanese DIW label and the fourth album by his "Brass Fantasy" group. It was released in 1989 and features performances by Bowie, Vincent Chancey, Frank Lacy, Steve Turre, E. J. Allen, Gerald Brezel, Stanton Davis, Bob Stewart, Ken Crutchfield, Vinnie Johnson and Famoudou Don Moye.

Reception
The Allmusic review by Scott Yanow awarded the album 4 stars, stating, "Serious Fun is one of the ensemble's earlier records and the material is better than usual... on this particular project it is mostly quite successful and full of Lester Bowie's wit".

Track listing
 "Papa's Got a Brand New Bag" (James Brown) - 4:40  
 "Smooth Operator" (Sade, Ray Saint John) - 6:59  
 "Inflated Tear" (Roland Kirk) - 7:24  
 "Da Butt" (Marcus Miller) - 6:05  
 "God Bless the Child" (Arthur Herzog Jr., Billie Holiday) - 14:59  
 "Don't Worry, Be Happy" (Bobby McFerrin) - 6:32  
 "Strange Fruit" (Lewis Allan) - 7:54  
Recorded at Systems Two, Brooklyn, NY on 4–6 April 1989

Personnel
Lester Bowie: trumpet
Vincent Chancey: French horn
Frank Lacy: trombone, vocals
Steve Turre: trombone 
E. J. Allen: trumpet
Gerald Brezel: trumpet 
Stanton Davis: trumpet, flugelhorn 
Bob Stewart: tuba
Famoudou Don Moye: percussion
Ken Crutchfield: drums
Vinnie Johnson: drums

References

1989 albums
DIW Records albums
Lester Bowie albums